Friendly Bilateral relations now exist between Nicaragua and the United States. However, in the 19th and 20th centuries, tensions were high and American intervention was frequent. In the 1980s Due to Red Scare paranoia and an attempt to put down socialism in the region,  the U.S proceeded to wage an undeclared war against the left-wing Sandinista movement by funding the Contra groups until it was defeated in the election in 1990.

History
The United States Marine Corps first landed in Nicaragua in 1852. According to Captain Harry Allenson Ellsworth, a Marine Corps historian, their presence was "for the protection of American lives and interests." One occasion was to protect an American mining company where workers were threatening a strike. Another time they just stayed long enough to burn down San Juan del Norte because - seven years earlier - the American minister to Nicaragua had been kept there overnight against his will before he was released just the following morning. Most Marine landings involved supporting one Nicaraguan faction against another.

Walker's 1855 filibustering
In the traditional historiography by historians in the United States and in Latin America, William Walker's filibustering represented the high tide of antebellum American imperialism. His brief seizure of Nicaragua in 1855 is typically called a representative expression of Manifest destiny with the added factor of trying to expand slavery into Central America.  Historian Michel Gobat, however, presents a strongly revisionist interpretation. He argues that Walker was invited in by Nicaraguan liberals who were trying to force economic modernization and political liberalism. Walker's government comprised those liberals, as well as Yankee colonizers, and European radicals. Walker even included some local Catholics as well as indigenous peoples, Cuban revolutionaries, and local peasants. His coalition was much too complex and diverse to survive long, but it was not the attempted projection of American power, concludes Gobat.

American protectorate 1913 to 1933
According to Benjamin Harrison, Wilson was committed in Latin America to the fostering of democracy and stable governments, as well as fair economic policies. Wilson was largely frustrated by the chaotic situation in Nicaragua. Adolfo Díaz won the presidency in 1911 and replaced European financing with loans from New York banks. Facing a Liberal rebellion, in 1913 he called on the United States for protection and President Woodrow Wilson obliged. Nicaragua assumed a quasi-protectorate status under the Bryan–Chamorro Treaty. Under the treaty Nicaragua promised it would not declare war on anyone, would not grant territorial concessions, and would not contract outside debts without Washington's approval. It permitted the US to build a naval base at Fonseca Bay, and gave the US the sole option to construct and control an inter-oceanic canal. The Panama Canal opened in 1914 and the US had no intention of building another canal, but wanted the guarantee that no other nation could do so. The US paid Nicaragua $3 million for this option. The original draft also asserted the duty of the United States to intervene militarily in case of domestic turmoil – but that provision was rejected by Democrats in the Senate. Nevertheless the US did send in Marines to protect the government and suppress local uprisings such as that of Augusto César Sandino after 1927. The treaty was extremely unpopular in the Caribbean region, but it was observed by both sides until 1933. Díaz was now able to serve out his entire term; he retired in 1917, and moved to the United States. (He returned briefly to power in 1926–1929).  According to George Baker, the main effect of the treaty was a higher degree of both political and financial stability in Nicaragua.  President Herbert Hoover (1929-1933) opposed the relationship.  Finally in 1933 President Franklin D Roosevelt, invoking his new Good Neighbor policy ended American intervention.

Nicaraguan Revolution
In the 1970s the FSLN began a campaign of kidnappings which led to national recognition of the group in the Nicaraguan media and solidification of the group as a force in opposition to the Somoza Regime, which ruled Nicaragua since 1937. The Somoza Regime, which included the Nicaraguan National Guard, a force highly trained by the U.S. military, declared a state of siege, and proceeded to use torture, extrajudicial killings, intimidation and censorship of the press in order to combat the FSLN attacks. This led to international condemnation of the regime and in 1978 the administration of U.S. president Jimmy Carter cut off aid to the Somoza regime due to its human rights violations (Boland Amendment). In response, Somoza lifted the state of siege in order to continue receiving aid.

Contra War 
Upon their inauguration in January, 1981, the Reagan Administration supported a strong anti-communist strategy in Latin America. The CIA funneled logistical, military, and financial support to Contras in neighboring Honduras, waging a guerrilla war to topple the Sandinista Administration in Nicaragua. In 1984, the CIA's 'Unilaterally Controlled Latin Assets' (UCLA) mined many Nicaraguan harbors, leading to several Nicaraguan and foreign ships being damaged or sunk, and the passing of the Boland Amendment by US Congress. Though the Boland Amendment made it illegal, the Reagan Administration continued to fund and arm the Contras through the Iran-Contra affair. The U.S Government continued to pressure the Sandinista Administration through election interference and support of the Contras until 1990, when the Sandinista Administration lost power.

Recent history

After being condemned for terrorism, the U.S has aimed to support the consolidation of the democratic process in Nicaragua with the 1990 election of President Chamorro.  The United States has promoted national reconciliation, encouraging Nicaraguans to resolve their problems through dialogue and compromise. It recognizes as legitimate all political forces that abide by the democratic process and eschew violence. U.S. assistance is focused on strengthening democratic institutions, stimulating sustainable economic growth, and supporting the health and basic education sectors.

Until recently, the resolution of U.S. citizen claims arising from Sandinista-era confiscations and expropriations still figured prominently in bilateral policy concerns. Section 527 of the Foreign Relations Authorization Act (1994) prohibits certain U.S. assistance and support for a government of a country that has confiscated U.S. citizen property, unless the government has taken certain remedial steps. After the Secretary of State had twenty times issued annual national interest waivers of the Section 527 prohibition, in August 2015 the U.S. Embassy in Managua announced a decision that the waiver was no longer needed, in a statement that included "The United States recognizes the work of the current government administration ‘to resolve pending claims in an expeditious and satisfactory manner.’"

Other key U.S. policy goals for Nicaragua are:
 Improving respect for human rights and resolving outstanding high-profile human rights cases;
 Developing a free market economy with respect for property and intellectual property rights;
 Ensuring effective civilian control over defense and security policy;
 Increasing the effectiveness of Nicaragua's efforts to combat trans-border crimes, including narcotics trafficking, money laundering, illegal alien smuggling, international terrorist and criminal organizations, and trafficking in persons; and
 Reforming the judicial system and implementing good governance.

Since 1990, the United States has provided over $1.2 billion in assistance to Nicaragua. About $260 million of that was for debt relief, and another $450 million was for balance-of-payments support. The U.S. also provided $93 million in 1999, 2000, and 2001 as part of its overall response to Hurricane Mitch. In response to Hurricane Felix, the United States provided over $400,000 in direct aid to Nicaragua to support recovery operations from the damage inflicted in September 2007. Aside from funding for Hurricanes Mitch and Felix, the levels of assistance have fallen incrementally to reflect the improvements in Nicaragua. Assistance has been focused on promoting more citizen political participation, compromise, and government transparency; stimulating sustainable growth and income; and fostering better-educated and healthier families. The Millennium Challenge Corporation signed a 5-year, $175 million compact with Nicaragua on July 14, 2005. The Millennium Challenge Compact is intended to reduce poverty and spur economic growth by funding projects in the regions of León and Chinandega aimed at reducing transportation costs and improving access to markets for rural communities; increasing wages and profits from farming and related enterprises in the region; and increasing investment by strengthening property rights.

NICA Act

In 2016, the Nicaragua Investment Conditionality Act of 2016 (NICA) was passed by the United States House of Representatives. It was unable to be approved by the Senate or the president due to the 2016 presidential election. The bill would, as a response to the alleged election fraud committed by president Daniel Ortega during the 2016 election, prevent Nicaragua from taking additional loans until they are willing to "[take] effective steps to hold free, fair and transparent elections." The bill was reintroduced to the House of Representatives again during a new session in 2017.

The Nicaraguan government and every single political party (including those who originally voiced concern over the election) opposed this bill, with Nicaraguan Vice President Rosario Murillo calling it a “reactionary and interventionist" action that would “undermine the right of Nicaragua to continue developing the socialist model.”. All ALBA member states are opposed to the bill. An international group of prominent trade unionists have also voiced their opposition to the bill by signing a solidarity statement in support of the Government of Nicaragua:

On December 20, 2018, U.S. President Donald Trump signed the NICA Act into law after it was unanimously approved by Congress. This enactment comes eight months after the beginning of the 2018–2021 Nicaraguan protests.

School of the Americas and Fr. Roy Bourgeois
In 1987, United States Senator Bob Dole visited Managua and criticized President Daniel Ortega for two of Nicaragua's political prisoners. Ortega offered to free the two political prisoners, who were opposition lawyers, in exchange for the freedom of the founder of School of the Americas Watch, Roy Bourgeois.

In 2012, Nicaragua ended relations with the School of the Americas, refusing to send any more trainees to the institute. In a news release, it stated that the School of the Americas has victimized Nicaragua (likely referring to the Contras, who were trained at the institute).

See also
 
 Foreign relations of Nicaragua
 Foreign relations of the United States
 Embassy of Nicaragua, Washington, D.C.
 Embassy of the United States, Managua
 Ambassadors of the United States to Nicaragua 
 Latin America–United States relations
 U.S. support for the Contras

References

Ambassador - U.S. Embassy Managua, Nicaragua

Further reading
 Baker, George W. "The Wilson Administration and Nicaragua, 1913–1921." The Americas 22.4 (1966): 339-376 The Wilson Administration and Nicaragua, 1913–1921  online
 Bemis, Samuel Flagg. The Latin American Policy of the United States. (1943) passim and p. 465  online
 Bermann, Karl. Under the big stick: Nicaragua and the United States since 1848 (Boston: South End Press, 1986)
 Booth, John A., Christine J. Wade, and Thomas Walker, eds. Understanding Central America: Global Forces, Rebellion, and Change (Westview Press, 2014)
 Colburn, Forrest D. Post-Revolutionary Nicaragua (University of California Press, 2020).
 Feinberg, Richard E. Nicaragua: Revolution and restoration (Foreign Policy at Brookings, 2018) online.
 Hager Jr, Robert P., and Robert S. Snyder. "The United States and Nicaragua: understanding the breakdown in relations." Journal of Cold War Studies 17.2 (2015): 3-35.
 Harrison, Benjamin T. "Woodrow Wilson and Nicaragua." Caribbean Quarterly 51.1 (2005): 25-36. online
 Hoekstra, Quint. "Helping the contras: The effectiveness of US support for foreign rebels during the Nicaraguan Contra War (1979–1990)." Studies in Conflict & Terrorism 44.6 (2021): 521-541.
 Lee, David Johnson. The Ends of Modernization: Nicaragua and the United States in the Cold War Era (Cornell UP, 2021).
 Kagan, Robert. A Twilight Struggle: American Power and Nicaragua, 1977-1990 (1996).
 Munro, Dana G. "Dollar Diplomacy in Nicaragua, 1909-1913." Hispanic American Historical Review 38.2 (1958): 209-234. online
 Neumann, Pamela. "The More Things Change: Continuities in US Foreign Policy toward Nicaragua under the Trump Administration." in The Future of US Empire in the Americas (Routledge, 2020) pp. 106–127.
 Pastor, Robert A. Not Condemned to Repetition: The United States and Nicaragua (Routledge, 2018).
 Roberts, Kenneth. “Bullying and Bargaining: The United States, Nicaragua, and Conflict Resolution in Central America.” International Security 15#2, (1990), pp. 67–102, online
 Travis, Philip W. Reagan's war on terrorism in Nicaragua: The outlaw state (Lexington Books, 2016).
 Walker, Thomas W., et al. Reagan versus the Sandinistas: The undeclared war on Nicaragua (Routledge, 2019).

Historiography
 Bell, Aaron T. ed. Gale Researcher Guide for: The Central American Crisis (Gale, Cengage Learning, 2018).

External links
The Sanctuary Movement from the Dean Peter Krogh Foreign Affairs Digital Archives

 
United States
Bilateral relations of the United States